The economy of North America comprises more than 596 million people (8% of the world population) in its 24 sovereign states and 15 dependent territories. It is marked by a sharp division between the predominantly English speaking countries of Canada and the United States, which are among the wealthiest and most developed nations in the world, and countries of Central America and the Caribbean in the former Latin America that are less developed. Mexico and Caribbean nations of the Commonwealth of Nations are between the economic extremes of the development of North America.

Mexico lies in between these two extremes as a newly industrialized country (NIC), and is a part of the North American Free Trade Agreement (NAFTA) and a member of the Organisation for Economic Co-operation and Development (OECD), being one of the only two Latin American members of this organisation (together with Chile). The United States is by far the largest economy in North America and the largest national economy in the world.

The US, Canada and Mexico have significant and multifaceted economic systems. In 2011, the US has an estimated per capita gross domestic product (PPP) of $47,200, and is the most technologically developed economy in North America. The United States' services sector comprises 80% of the country's GDP (estimated in 2017), industry comprises 19.1% and agriculture comprises 0.9%.

Canada's economic trends are similar to that of the United States, with significant growth in the sectors of services, mining and manufacturing. Canada's GDP (PPP) was estimated at $39,400 in 2010. Canada's services sector comprises 70.2% of the country's GDP (estimated in 2017), industry comprises 28.2% and agriculture comprises 1.6%.

Mexico has a GDP (PPP) of $15,312, and per capita income is estimated at one-third of the United States'. The country has both modern and outdated industrial and agricultural facilities and operations, and is modernizing in sectors such as energy production, telecommunications and airports.

Economic development

Great Depression
The Great Depression began in North America in October 1929.  The start is often dated to the stock market collapse of Black Tuesday although this was not the cause of the Great Depression.  Canada and the United States experienced especially large declines, with the gross domestic product falling 37% from 1929 to 1933 in the United States, and 43% in Canada over the same period.  The economy reached its lowest point in 1933, however recovery was slow.  The outbreak of World War II in 1939 created demand for war materials that brought about the end of the depression.

The Great Depression spurred increased government intervention in the economy in North America.  The United States introduced unemployment insurance, a minimum wage and standardised working hours under the New Deal.  Canada introduced similar measures.  Mexico nationalised some key industries during the Great Depression, with the railroads nationalised by 1937 and the oil industry nationalised in 1938.

World War II
Due to the large scale enlistment of men into armed forces during World War II, women entered the workforce en masse, filling many jobs in manufacturing and technical areas that had previously been closed to women.  This led to the "We can do it!" campaign.  The economic output in North America increased substantially, with unemployment practically eliminated in the United States.  Rationing severely reduced the availability of consumer goods, with the increase in industrial production coming from the demand for war materials. During the peak of World War II activity, nearly 40 per cent of US GDP was devoted to war production.

Cold War
After the 2nd world war, the United States and Russia emerged as the world superpowers with both economies being strong and thus each country wanted to be recognised as a superpower.The relationship between the two countries further deteriorated with the space race.

US-Canada Free Trade Agreement and NAFTA - a new era of economic integration
The Canada-United States Free Trade Agreement of 1989 and the subsequent expansion to the North American Free Trade Agreement (NAFTA) triggered a dramatic increase in trade between these three countries, with Mexican trade with the United States and Canada increasing threefold.  Over 85% of Canadian exports in 2006 went to the United States.

Regional variation
With various climate zones, agricultural products vary from country to country. Job sectors are also different, with industrialized countries having more service workers, and developing countries relying on agriculture.

Trade blocs

Asia-Pacific Economic Cooperation
The Asia-Pacific Economic Cooperation (APEC) is a group of Pacific Rim countries which meet with the purpose of improving economic and political ties. APEC's stated goals are aimed at free and open trade and investments by cutting tariffs between zero and five percent in the Asia-Pacific area for industrialised economies by 2010 and for developing economies by 2020.

The organisation has members from four continents, those from North America are Canada, Mexico and the United States.

Caribbean Community
The Caribbean Community (CARICOM) was created "To provide dynamic leadership and service, in partnership with Community institutions and Groups, toward the attainment of a viable, internationally competitive and sustainable Community, with improved quality of life for all". Its secretariat is based in Georgetown, Guyana, South America.

- On January 1, 2006, six members: (Barbados, Belize, Guyana, Jamaica, Suriname and Trinidad and Tobago) unofficially ushered in the Caribbean (CARICOM) Single Market and Economy (CSME).

- At the official signing of the protocol on January 30, 2006, in Jamaica, A further six members: (Antigua and Barbuda, Dominica, Grenada, Saint Kitts and Nevis, Saint Lucia and Saint Vincent and the Grenadines) announced their intention to join by the second quarter of 2006. Montserrat, a British Oversees territory is awaiting approval by the United Kingdom. Haiti and the Bahamas have no immediate plans to join.

Central American Free Trade Agreement
The Central American Free Trade Agreement (CAFTA) is an agreement between the United States and the Central American countries of Costa Rica, Guatemala, El Salvador, Honduras, and Nicaragua. The treaty is aimed at promoting free trade between its members. Canada and Mexico are negotiating membership.

North American Free Trade Agreement
The North American Free Trade Agreement (NAFTA) is an agreement between Canada, Mexico and the United States to eliminate tariffs on goods traded between themselves.

Although currently only a trade agreement, with no supranational bodies or laws as in the European Union, there have been various proposals to move towards a customs union or a North American currency union. It is unknown whether this may eventually develop into a North American Union similar to that of Europe.

Currency

Below is a list of the currencies of North America, with exchange rates between each currency and both the euro and US dollars as of 20 July 2022. This list may vary as it is not current.

Table correct as of 20 July 2022

Economic sectors

Agriculture
Agriculture is very important in Central American and Caribbean nations. In western Canada, in the provinces of Saskatchewan, Alberta, British Columbia and Manitoba, wheat and other various main agricultural products are grown. The U.S. also has many states with significant agriculture production, mainly in the central continental U.S. Mexico produces many tropical fruits and vegetables as well as edible animals.

Manufacturing
North America has developed and its manufacturing sector has grown. In the beginning the European nations were the large manufacturing powers. At the start of the 1950s, the United States was a top manufacturing power, with Canada and Mexico also making significant progress.

Service
In Canada, the US and the Caribbean, service-based employment is a significant percentage of overall employment. Many people work in stores and other retail locations. In Canada more than 70% work in the services sector, with a similar percentage in the United States.

Investment and banking
The United States leads North America in investment and banking. Canada, Mexico and most recently, February 2011,  El Salvador is growing in this sector.  And smaller economic powers such as Guatemala, Honduras, Costa Rica, and Panama are also growing slowly in this sector.

Tourism
Tourism is extremely important for the Caribbean economies, as they contain many beaches and have warm climates. Skiing in Canada and the US is also important. Tourism of national parks and natural landmarks, such as Mount Rushmore and the Grand Canyon in the United States, and Niagara Falls and Moraine lake in Canada, contribute to the economy in these regions.

See also 
 North America
 North American Industry Classification System

Statistics:
 List of North American countries by GDP (PPP)
 List of North American countries by GDP (nominal)
 List of North American countries by GDP per capita

References

 
North America